Huddersfield Town's 1916–17 campaign saw Town continuing to play in the wartime football league. Town played in the Midland League and finished in 4th place, as well as 6th place in the Subsidiary Competition.

Results

Midland Division

Subsidiary competition

Huddersfield Town A.F.C. seasons
Huddersfield Town F.C.